Gnathodon may refer to:

 Golden trevally (Gnathanodon speciosus) named by Peter Forsskål in 1775

as well as the synonyms

 Odontaster a genus of seastars has the junior synonym of Gnathodon coined by Verrill in 1899
 Rangia a genus of bivalves which has the junior synonym of Gnathodon coined by Desmoulins in 1832 
 Tooth-billed pigeon which was called Gnathodon strigirostris by Jardine, in 1845